= Zhangzhou Tan Company =

Chinese food company

Zhangzhou Tan Co. Ltd. trading as TAN CO. is a food company based in Zhangzhou, Fujian province, China. The company began trading in 1994, as a comprehensive service provider, especially dedicating to the development & research for canned foodstuff, brand building, the sharing of export information, resources reassignment.
